The TVR Speed Twelve engine is the name of a V12 engine manufactured by TVR for use in the TVR Speed 12 race car, and later the TVR Cerbera Speed Twelve road car.

The engine was developed by essentially joining two Speed Six engine blocks to a common crankshaft.  However it featured a revised cylinder head design with bucket valve actuation in place of the Speed Six's finger follower system.  The completed engine displaced 7.7 litres and was originally developed for racing applications in TVR's Speed Twelve.  Later on, a version was developed for the prototype of a road car to be called the Cerbera Speed Twelve.

Unusually for an automobile, the Speed Twelve's engine block was not constructed of cast iron or aluminum alloy, but rather of steel.

For the road-version of the engine, the restrictors were not needed so the engine was developed without them. According to reports from TVR engineers, the de-restricted engine snapped the central shaft of their -rated dynamometer during the bench-test. When the prototype vehicle was road-tested by then-owner Peter Wheeler, he reportedly concluded that the vehicle was too powerful to be practical and the project was scrapped.

References

Twelve
V12 engines